The National Dreamtime Awards, known simply as the Dreamtime Awards, are an annual celebration of Australian Aboriginal and Torres Strait Islander achievement in sport, arts, academic and community.

History
The National Dreamtime Awards were launched to fill the void in recognising Indigenous Australians' achievements as a result of the 2013 cessation of the Deadly Awards.

Description
A panel of experts judges the final winners in each category, determined by nomination and voting process through online and media partners.

Awards
 National Dreamtime Awards 2017
 National Dreamtime Awards 2018
 National Dreamtime Awards 2019

2020–2021
Owing to the COVID-19 pandemic in Australia, the 2020 event took place on 11 December 2020, and the 2021 event was cancelled. Rugby league player Jack Wighton was recognised as 2020 Sportsman of the Year, and Kerrie Kennedy won the Awabakal Excellence in Education Award.

See also

Indigenous Australian music
 List of television awards

References

External links

 
Indigenous Australian mass media
Australian television awards
Organisations serving Indigenous Australians
Australian music awards
2017 establishments in Australia
Awards established in 2017